Mayfield High School (MHS) is one of four traditional public high schools in Las Cruces, New Mexico. As of 2009–10, the school has over 2,300 students and 130 teachers, and covers grades 9–12. The school is a part of the Las Cruces Public Schools district.

History
MHS was opened in 1965 after Las Cruces High School became overcrowded.  It became the second high school in Las Cruces. The school was named after former Las Cruces Public Schools superintendent, Thomas J. Mayfield.

In 1967, the school colors were chosen as green and gold, the Green Bay Packers' colors, who were the National Football League champions in that year.  The mascot Trojan was chosen the same year, largely because the University of Southern California Trojans won the NCAA football Championship.

School grade
The NMPED (New Mexico Public Education department) replaced the "No child left behind act" and "AYP testing" with a new school grading formula, which took effect for the 2010-11 school years. The grade is calculated using many forms of testing, and includes graduation rates.

Demographics

Rivalry

The Mayfield-Las Cruces high school football rivalry was voted the 9th best in the nation by rivals.com in 2008, and was ranked the 2nd biggest rivalry by USA today in 2013.  The movie "Cruces Divided" was filmed based on this rivalry.

Athletics
MHS competes in the New Mexico Activities Association (NMAA), as a class 6A school in District 3. In 2014, NMAA realigned the state's schools in to six classifications and adjusted district boundaries.  In addition to Mayfield High School, the schools in District 3-6A include: Oñate High School, Las Cruces High School, Gadsden High School and Deming High School.

Notable alumni
 Darius Holland - former professional defensive end in the National Football League
 Edgar Castillo, class of 2004 - professional soccer player
 Doug Eddings - Major League Baseball umpire
 George Hennard, mass murderer
 Austin Trout - Professional Boxer

References

External links
 Mayfield High School

Educational institutions established in 1965
Public high schools in New Mexico
Schools in Doña Ana County, New Mexico
1965 establishments in New Mexico